She Gets Her Man is a 1935 American comedy film directed by William Nigh and written by Aben Kandel. The film stars ZaSu Pitts, Hugh O'Connell, Helen Twelvetrees, Lucien Littlefield, Edward Brophy, and Warren Hymer. It was released on August 5, 1935, by Universal Pictures.

Plot
The cook in a small-town Arkansas diner manages to foil a gang planning a bank robbery.

Cast  
ZaSu Pitts as Esmeralda
Hugh O'Connell as Windy
Helen Twelvetrees as Francine
Lucien Littlefield as Elmer
Edward Brophy as Flash
Warren Hymer as Spike
Bert Gordon as Goofy
Ward Bond as Chick

References

External links 
 

1935 films
American comedy films
1935 comedy films
Universal Pictures films
Films directed by William Nigh
American black-and-white films
Films scored by Karl Hajos
Films set in Arkansas
1930s English-language films
1930s American films